Huntly railway station is a railway station serving the town of Huntly in Scotland. The station is managed by ScotRail and is on the Aberdeen to Inverness Line, between Insch and Keith,  from Aberdeen.

A small goods yard is located adjacent to the station and operated by DB Schenker, although it looks to have been out of use for a considerable number of years. A goods shed remains standing within the yard.

History 

The station was opened by the Great North of Scotland Railway on 20 September 1854, with the commissioning of the line from the original Waterloo terminus in Aberdeen. A goods service had started a week earlier. The initial passenger service took 2 hours, with 3 trains a day, calling at all stations. Only mail trains ran on Sundays. The route onwards to  followed on 11 October 1856, with the through link to the new joint station at  completed in November 1867 to connect the GNSR to the Aberdeen Railway.

The station passed into the hands of the LNER at the 1923 Grouping and the Scottish Region of British Railways in January 1948. It has retained its signal box, which has been refurbished and controls the passing loop and level crossing here.

The original station building, which had an overall roof and was described in 1898 as, "a decent structure of the old fashioned 'roofed-over' type", was demolished and replaced in 1999 with a smaller ticket office (staffed part-time) and waiting room.

Facilities
The station's ticket office is staffed six days per week from early morning until early afternoon (06:50 – 13:50, Mon-Sat). A self-service ticket machine is provided for use outside of these times and for collecting advance purchase tickets. A pay phone and post box are available, along with shelters on each platform and toilets in the booking hall (the latter open only when the station is staffed). Train running information is offered via customer help points, CIS displays, automatic announcements and timetable posters. Step-free access is available to both platforms via ramps, though the footbridge linking them has steps.

Passenger volume 

The statistics cover twelve month periods that start in April.

Services

As of May 2022, there is a basic two-hourly frequency in each directions (with peak extras), to  northbound and  southbound (12 trains southbound, 11 northbound). The first departure to Aberdeen each weekday and Saturday continues south to Edinburgh Waverley, and another continues to Stonehaven in the evening. On Sundays there are five trains each way.

References

Bibliography

External links

 Video footage and narration
 RAILSCOT on the Great North of Scotland Railway

Railway stations in Aberdeenshire
Former Great North of Scotland Railway stations
Railway stations in Great Britain opened in 1854
Railway stations served by ScotRail
1854 establishments in Scotland
Huntly